Novosyolki is a rural locality in Verkhnelyubazhsky Selsoviet Rural Settlement, Fatezhsky District, Kursk Oblast, Russia. The population as of 2010 is 9.

Geography 
The village is located in the Svapa River basin (a right tributary of the Seym River), 112 km from the Russia–Ukraine border, 64 km north-west of Kursk, 21 km north-east of the district center – the town Fatezh, 8 km from the selsoviet center – Verkhny Lyubazh.

Climate
Novosyolki has a warm-summer humid continental climate (Dfb in the Köppen climate classification).

Transport 
Novosyolki is located 3 km from the federal route  Crimea Highway (a part of the European route ), 5 km from the road of regional importance  (Verkhny Lyubazh – Ponyri), on the road of intermunicipal significance  (M2 "Crimea Highway" – Petroselki), 27 km from the nearest railway station Kurbakinskaya (railway line Arbuzovo – Luzhki-Orlovskiye).

The rural locality is situated 65 km from Kursk Vostochny Airport, 188 km from Belgorod International Airport and 236 km from Voronezh Peter the Great Airport.

References

Notes

Sources

Rural localities in Fatezhsky District